Desmond Daniel Amofah (May 12, 1990 –  June 19, 2019), better known as Etika, was an American YouTuber and online streamer. He was best known for his highly energetic reactions to Super Smash Bros. character reveals and Nintendo Direct presentations, and for playing and reacting to various games. He was a son of Ghanaian politician Owuraku Amofah, and a resident of Brooklyn, New York, for most of his life.

Amofah began his YouTube career in 2006, later creating his main YouTube channel, "EWNetwork" (meaning "Etika World Network"), in July 2012. His fanbase was dubbed the "JOYCONBOYZ", named after the Nintendo Switch controller, the Joy-Con. He became popular after the release of Super Smash Bros. 4, through his videos where he often discussed elements and new developments regarding the game. His channel consisted largely of stream material, namely playthroughs of recently released games and reactions to trailers, alongside additional edited videos.

In October 2018, Amofah's channel was terminated after he had a mental breakdown and uploaded pornography. After apologizing on his subreddit, r/EtikaRedditNetwork, Amofah created his second channel, "EtikaFRFX" (meaning "for real facts"), which would also be terminated in April 2019 after Amofah had another breakdown and uploaded pornography to that channel as well. He then had a series of breakdowns and was detained by police, the latter of which was streamed live to his Instagram followers. Following the termination of his second channel, Amofah uploaded content using his personal account he created in 2006, "TR1Iceman", and streamed through a separate channel, "E Live", with both channels currently still available to view on YouTube.

During the last few months of his life, Amofah showed signs of mental illness and threatened to commit suicide on multiple occasions, and was hospitalized multiple times under police restraint. Amofah disappeared on the evening of June 19, 2019. Later that night, an apologetic video was uploaded on his "TR1Iceman" channel in which he admitted to being mentally ill and suicidal. Following the discovery of his belongings on the pedestrian walkway of the Manhattan Bridge, Amofah's body was discovered in the East River on June 24, by the New York City Police Department, who confirmed online the next day that Amofah had died. On June 26, the Office of Chief Medical Examiner concluded that Amofah had drowned after jumping off the Manhattan Bridge.

His death was met with expressions of shock and grief by fans, other YouTubers, and the media, with many calling for the public to take mental health more seriously, as the signs of Amofah's mental deterioration were downplayed or ignored. Several memorials and murals were set up around the New York City area for Amofah shortly following his death.

Early life
Desmond Daniel Amofah was born on May 12, 1990, in Brooklyn, New York, to father Owuraku Amofah, a Ghanaian politician and lawyer from Kibi, and Haitian mother Sabrina Amofah. His great-uncle was Nana Akufo-Addo, who has served as President of Ghana since January 2017. Amofah had several siblings, including an older brother, Randy Amofah (1982–2010), who died from an asthma attack. He also had a half-brother, Cardinal Valery, who has a YouTube account dubbed "IAM9INE".

Amofah attended the public school Shell Bank Junior High School for one year, and was pulled out of the school by his mother after Amofah got in several fights with other students. In a 2018 livestream, Amofah stated that his craziest fight took place at Shell Bank, in which he and another student had an intense fight over a girl. They became friends afterward.

Amofah attended Urban Assembly School for Law and Justice (SLJ), a small law-themed college preparatory public high school, and graduated from there in 2008. While he attended the school, Amofah made several DVDs in a series called "SLJ FAM." He was also in a club known as the Free Food Mafia. Amofah attended the SLJ reunion 10 years after graduation.

Prior to his YouTube career, Amofah was active in modeling and rapping, having released an independently produced mixtape titled Written in Ice in 2007 under his pseudonym "Iceman". In 2008, Amofah participated in two Grind Time Now rap battles. Amofah started modeling in 2011 and continued until 2015. He owned an account on the website Model Mayhem, where he stated he was "quite tall" and that his last measurement of height was "six feet, six inches."

Amofah stated in a tweet that the pseudonym "Etika" came from the 2003 video game Sonic Battle, as he was a fan of the Sonic the Hedgehog series in his youth. In the game, players could input a cheat code titled "EkiTa", and when Amofah was 12, he simply switched the T and the K to create his username as he "liked that result better". He grew a high top fade after playing Grand Theft Auto: San Andreas.

Career

YouTube 
Having previously used the YouTube account "TR1Iceman" since 2006, Amofah created a new YouTube account in 2012 to broadcast his gaming and reaction streams, under his original username "EWNetwork". It was originally planned for the channel's content to be produced collaboratively by a variety of users including Amofah himself, but such plans never materialized. Prior to the closure of his main channel on YouTube in 2018, he had more than 800,000 subscribers between his YouTube and Twitch channels, and within months after creating a second YouTube channel, known as "EtikaFRFX", he had gained more than 130,000 subscribers.

Amofah's content was typically Nintendo-focused. He frequently streamed reactions, often over-the-top, to Nintendo Direct presentations, which usually involved him screaming and falling out of his chair in elated shock, and tossing objects in his room around. One of Amofah's most famous reactions was his reaction to Mewtwo being revealed as a fighter in Super Smash Bros. 4, during which Amofah excitedly screams "Mewtwo!" several times. The video was Amofah's most viewed video on his "EWNetwork" channel, and the reaction was retweeted by the creator of the game; Masahiro Sakurai. Amofah's last Smash Bros. reaction was his reaction to the reveal of Banjo & Kazooie in Super Smash Bros. Ultimate, 8 days before his disappearance. He was given the "Best Reaction" award at Super Smash Con's 2018 and 2019 iterations.

Amofah dubbed his fans the "JOYCONBOYZ", after the Nintendo Switch controllers known as the Joy-Con, and would frequently end his videos with his signature catchphrase "Take care of yourselves, and of course, as usual, please have yourself a damn good one." Despite focusing on Nintendo-related content, Amofah also did playthroughs of indie games (e.g., Undertale, Deltarune and Doki Doki Literature Club!), and he also played on the Minecraft anarchy server 2b2t. Amofah was also a fan of the anime and manga series JoJo's Bizarre Adventure, and did several livestreams of him watching episodes of Phantom Blood and Battle Tendency while giving commentary.

Amofah briefly changed his channel name to "Young Ramsay" in 2015 after cooking scallops, having been inspired by the celebrity chef Gordon Ramsay. Soon afterward, Ramsay himself followed Amofah on Twitter. In June 2017, Amofah did a livestream of him browsing the deep web and received an unexpected phone call on his personal phone number after ending the stream, which made Amofah feel uncomfortable and not want to go on the deep web anymore. On December 24, 2018, Amofah did a Christmas livestream which featured himself dressed as Santa Claus.

Fake Nintendo Switch and fake donors 
In November 2016, two videos of Amofah's where he purported to have a Nintendo Switch console before its 2017 release gained notoriety and were scrutinized by fans. It was later revealed that the model Amofah was using was 3D-printed by fellow YouTuber "Sandqvist" at his request.

In June 2017, Amofah revealed himself to be the victim of multiple "chargebacks", or "fake donations" of large amounts of money sent to his PayPal account via stream donations, which would jostle Amofah with hundreds of dollars in processing fees.

Channel terminations and breakdowns 

On October 23, 2018, Amofah was temporarily suspended from Twitter for using the word nigga in a tweet. He responded to the suspension by uploading a video of himself frequently saying the word and defending himself for using it. Amofah stated that the word had been adopted by black people "from a tool of hatred into a form of love" and should no longer be treated as a racial slur. During the video, Amofah name-checked rappers Travis Scott and Drake, who use the word in their songs. Two days later, Amofah uploaded pornography to his YouTube channel "EWNetwork" (then titled Etika), which violated YouTube's policies and consequently led to the channel's termination. He later had his second channel "EtikaFRFX" terminated in April 2019 for the same reason. He was also banned from Twitch that year for using a homophobic slur during a stream. Following the termination of his "EWNetwork" channel, Amofah posted cryptic messages to social media, including the statement "it's my turn to die", coupled with a screenshot of his terminated account. Several of his followers felt that the messages and posts were suicidal in nature, which quickly created a panic within his following. Amofah took to social media that evening to confirm his well-being, along with other streamers who professed to have seen him safe and sound in person, to allay his followers' fears. He later apologized on his subreddit r/EtikaRedditNetwork. On October 29, 2018, Amofah confirmed on his Twitch stream that he purposefully deleted his channel because he did not receive ad revenue from the channel.

On April 16, 2019, following the termination of his second channel "EtikaFRFX", Amofah posted several tweets about ending his life, the first one stating "Savonarola! I'm going to kill myself! You lot certainly have already. Shame on you all, silly humans." He then tweeted he would kill himself by shooting himself in the head. This tweet subsequently led to his detainment and hospitalization. Christine Cardona, who had dated Amofah from 2011 to 2017, confirmed his well-being, and that she had been "observing him all day". Days later, Amofah posted a photoshopped picture of himself holding a gun, which Cardona later confirmed was fake.

On April 29, after tweeting a vast quantity of cryptic messages, including homophobic and ethnic slurs (that were promptly deleted), he blocked close friends of his and other YouTubers. Later that day, he live-streamed himself being detained by police to over 19,000 viewers on Instagram Live, after a concerned fan notified police about his alarmingly erratic nature during a livestream. Before being detained, Amofah shouted phrases and quotes from his apartment window, including the quote "The revolution will not be televised, only felt," which he also posted to Twitter on several occasions. Later that day, Amofah also did a livestream titled "hi" on his channel "TR1Iceman", during which he played songs from the Playboi Carti album Die Lit for a couple of minutes without saying anything.

On April 30, Amofah was interviewed by Keemstar on his YouTube channel "DramaAlert", in which Amofah stated he was the "antichrist" and that he wanted to "purge all life". Amofah was detained again later that same week for assaulting a police officer. Later that day, Amofah did a livestream titled "Stupid Monkey", during which he ate a carton of raw eggs and made several monkey noises without saying anything.

Amofah's erratic behavior around this time led some of his followers to take the events preceding his suicide as a humorous performance by Amofah, rather than signs of him struggling with his mental health. The video where Amofah assaulted a police officer was posted online with the caption "LMFAOOOOOOOO", and people who witnessed the event were laughing. During the majority of Amofah's livestreams in 2019, most of the viewers in the chat spammed clown emojis.

Disappearance and death 

At midnight on June 20, 2019, a video titled "I'm sorry" was uploaded to Amofah's personal YouTube channel "TR1Iceman". In the video, Amofah admitted to having mental health issues, struggling with the attention he had gained from streaming and apologized for pushing people away from him. YouTube soon removed the video for violating its Community Guidelines, though Amofah's fans reposted the video to other outlets. Amofah was last heard from at 8:36 PM Eastern Time (ET) on June 19, commenting "Dope..." on a YouTube video for the Travis Scott song "90210" in 432hz. After leaving some of his personal belongings on the pedestrian walkway, Amofah jumped from the Manhattan Bridge and drowned. According to Amofah's ex-girlfriend, Christine Cardona, he allegedly died on June 22.

Amofah was reported missing to the New York Police Department (NYPD) the day after the "I'm sorry" video was uploaded. While the NYPD began its search, fellow Internet personalities and his fans tried to reach out to him to offer their help and show their appreciation for his work over the years. On the night of June 19, the same day of Amofah's disappearance, his belongings were discovered on the pedestrian walkway of the Manhattan Bridge. They included a backpack, wallet, laptop bag, cell phone, a change of clothes, and a Nintendo Switch.

On the evening of June 24, a body was observed near Pier 16, approximately half a mile (0.8 km) down the East River from where Amofah's belongings were recovered, and reported to the NYPD. By the morning of June 25, the NYPD and emergency medical services had recovered the body, confirmed it was Amofah, and stated that he was dead at the point of recovery. The following day, the Office of Chief Medical Examiner confirmed the cause of death was suicide by drowning.

Reactions
Amofah's death highlighted social media platforms' handling of posts by users who appear at risk of mental illness or who are contemplating suicide. YouTube, in removing Amofah's final video, stated that removal of such videos is standard practice in order to "reduce the potential for copycat acts of self-harm, videos that express suicidal ideation", and as part of this, sent information to Amofah's account related to national suicide hotlines in order to provide help.

Following his death, several YouTubers posted tributes to Amofah on Twitter and YouTube. PewDiePie was one of the first YouTubers to post a tribute to Amofah, stating in a tweet: "Hard to grasp that he’s actually gone, left us way too soon. You will continue to live on in our hearts. Rest in peace Etika." James Charles also took to Twitter, stating: "RIP Etika. My heart is so so heavy hearing this news. I hope that the community FINALLY realizes that creators are human beings with real, valid feelings." Minecraft YouTuber FitMC, who collaborated with Amofah during his 2b2t playthrough a month prior to his death, stated in a tweet that Amofah "changed streaming forever" and "showed how a streamer could affect people's lives." The official "YouTube Creators" Twitter account also posted a tribute to Amofah, stating: “We mourn the loss of Etika, a beloved member of our gaming creator community." Rapper Lil Nas X posted a tribute to Amofah, stating that he "didn’t know Amofah very well" but did know that he "inspired many and made a lot of people very happy."

Mental health researchers found several videos Amofah had posted that showed evidence of his troubled state but were taken as jokes by some of his viewers, rather than as genuine signs of mental illness. As a result, some took Amofah's final video as another joke and disregarded any concern over his well-being; YouTuber Keemstar initially thought Amofah's final video was a premeditated publicity stunt, stating after Amofah's death, "I was never fully convinced that he was mentally ill or in trouble because of our private convos." The aforementioned mental health researchers stressed the need to inform more people on social media about the signs of mental illness, depression, and suicidal thoughts so that they can better recognize when people in a mindset similar to Amofah's are in danger and need support. Keemstar briefly became a target of some of Amofah's fans, who blamed him for Amofah's suicide due to the "DramaAlert" interview and statements made in tweets before and following the interview. Keemstar later posted screenshots of a series of texts allegedly sent to him by Amofah's mother Sabrina, which stated that "Etika loved Keemstar's show" and had only wanted to make a memorable appearance on it. Despite Sabrina's alleged defense of Keemstar, he was later accused of influencing Amofah's death in May 2020 by Internet personality Ethan Klein. In response to this accusation, he stated: "I said some stuff that was completely stupid and wrong... but I did not kill this man." Keemstar also claimed that Amofah's friends and family had told Klein to stop using Amofah's suicide to attack him.

Shortly after Amofah's death, YouTuber ImJayStation posted a video where he attempted to contact Amofah from beyond the grave, which was widely criticized for being disrespectful.

Legacy
Following Amofah's suicide, fans through both Twitter and email asked for YouTube to re-upload Amofah's final video to help memorialize him. A Change.org petition was started and initially garnered more than 380,000 signatures, but later dropped to 197,000 signatures after many fraudulent signatures from Internet bots were removed. It asked for Amofah's original channel to be restored to preserve his legacy. Another Change.org petition with over a million signatures, which later dropped to over 200,000 for similar reasons, called for Amofah to be buried at YouTube headquarters, which he stated was his wish during an earlier livestream.

Fans erected a memorial on Amofah's behalf on the pedestrian walkway of the Manhattan Bridge, leaving letters, fan art, Twizzlers, Nintendo-related products, and other memorabilia.

On June 25, 2019, YouTuber Abe Hunter announced he was the owner and operator of Amofah's website, and subsequently converted it into a fundraiser site where 100% of the profits were to be donated to the National Alliance on Mental Illness (NAMI) in Amofah's name. On July 15, 2019, on behalf of the Joy-Con Boyz community, Abe Hunter donated the $11,315.25 raised in memory of Amofah.

Following Amofah's death, his half-brother Cardinal Valery began the #Etikaforever Movement in Amofah's memory.

On July 21, 2019, fellow YouTuber PewDiePie and American actor Jack Black started a fundraiser on the crowdfunding website GoFundMe for the NAMI. PewDiePie and Black streamed themselves playing Minecraft together to raise money for their fundraiser. PewDiePie himself donated $10,000 and raised over $30,000.

YouTubers Abe Hunter and Double-A worked with mural artist BK Foxx and graffiti artists Kestaadm and JMZWalls to create a 40-feet-long mural completed by November 2019 dedicated to Amofah in Bushwick, Brooklyn. The mural was created to celebrate Amofah's life and to help bring awareness to mental health issues. The mural's location was added as a virtual "PokéStop" in the augmented reality game Pokémon Go in February 2020 after over 350,000 people requested Niantic to add it in memory of Amofah.

In August 2019, an Indiegogo campaign was started on Amofah's behalf. The charity campaign was created to earn donations for The Jed Foundation. Contributors to the campaign received a custom-made pair of Etika-themed Joy-Con shells dubbed "Etikons". The campaign had raised over $10,000 by the end of 2019. Additional Etikons had been made and sold online after the campaign, but according to the individual selling the shells, Nintendo had sent them a cease and desist letter around September 2020 demanding they halt all further sales of the remaining stock due to the use of trademarked terms on the shells. Nintendo subsequently received criticism for this decision.

Amofah's Twitter account was hacked on August 24, 2019, which resulted in the account being suspended. The hacker wrote a series of offensive and disrespectful tweets, which gained mass backlash from Amofah's fans and friends. In response to the hacking, Twitter temporarily suspended Amofah's account and later reinstated it after the hacker's tweets were deleted. On February 14, 2020, Amofah's Twitter account was suspended a second time, but it was reinstated following requests from Amofah's fans.

Amofah was honored on the popular Minecraft multiplayer server 2b2t in August 2019 with their likeness recreated with in-game materials and displayed using map items.

On August 21, 2020, YouTuber and Amofah fan JoyConJames worked with clothing company Top Gun to bring back a discontinued purple bomber jacket, famously worn by Amofah. A portion of all proceeds from sales raised went to the National Alliance on Mental Illness (NAMI) in memory of Amofah. 

In February 2021, fans of Amofah pointed out that the second DLC Fighter Pass for Super Smash Bros. Ultimate contains several characters Amofah had expressed a strong liking towards, including Pyra and Mythra from Xenoblade Chronicles 2 and Min Min from Arms.

In January 2022, a group named EtikaPunks produced a non-fungible token (NFT) collection of the same name, featuring pixelated drawings of Amofah in a style similar to CryptoPunks, one of which featured a bridge in the background (alluding to his suicide). The collection was condemned by Amofah's fans who considered it disrespectful and an attempt to "monetize Etika's passing".

See also
List of solved missing person cases
List of YouTubers

References

External links

 
 

1990 births
2019 deaths
2019 suicides
2010s missing person cases
21st-century American rappers
African-American male models
African-American male rappers
American people of Ghanaian descent
American YouTubers
East River
English-language YouTube channels
Formerly missing people
Gaming-related YouTube channels
Gaming YouTubers
Internet memes introduced in 2014
Let's Players
Missing person cases in New York City
Models from New York City
Nintendo game players
People from Brooklyn
Suicides by drowning in the United States
Suicides in New York City
Twitch (service) streamers
Victims of cyberbullying
YouTube channels launched in 2012
YouTube channels closed in 2018
YouTube controversies
YouTube vloggers